A list of films produced or co-produced in Singapore ordered by year in the 2010s. For a complete list of Singaporean films, see :Category:Singaporean films

 List of Singaporean films of 2010
 List of Singaporean films of 2011
 List of Singaporean films of 2012
 List of Singaporean films of 2013
 List of Singaporean films of 2014
 List of Singaporean films of 2015
 List of Singaporean films of 2016
 List of Singaporean films of 2017
 List of Singaporean films of 2018
 List of Singaporean films of 2019

See also 
List of Singaporean films

Films
Singapore